The Adamu Tafawa Balewa College of Education is a state government higher education institution located in Kangere, Bauchi State, Nigeria. The current provost is Adamu Magaji Yanbuga.

History 
The Adamu Tafawa Balewa College of Education was established in 2014. It was formerly known as Bauchi State Institute of Education Kangere.

Courses 
The institution offers the following courses;

 Home Economics
 Business Education
 Agricultural Science Education
 Islamic Religion Studies
 Education and Arabic
 Economics
 Early Childhood and Primary Education
 Education and English
 Hausa
 Physical and Health Education
 French
 Physics Education
 Geography
 Chemistry Education
 Biology Education
 Adult and Non-Formal Education
 Mathematics
 Management Studies
 Computer Science Education
 Social Development
 Integrated Science Education
 Social Studies
 Nomadic Education
 Christian Religious Studies

References 

Universities and colleges in Nigeria
2014 establishments in Nigeria